The 2013–14 Newcastle Jets FC W-League season was the club's sixth participation in the W-League, since the league's formation in 2008.

Season overview

Players

Squad information

Transfers in

Transfers out

Squad statistics

Disciplinary record

Goal scorers

Competitions

W-League

Pre-season

Matches

League table

Results summary

Results by round

References

External links
 Official website

Newcastle Jets FC (A-League Women) seasons
Newcastle